James Seymour Brett (born 3 April 1974) is an English composer and conductor.

Early career

After graduating from the Royal Academy of Music in 1997, Brett was immediately hired by composer Michael Kamen. Brett's further contribution to film scores includes writing collaborations with Kamen on features such as The Event Horizon, What Dreams May Come, The Iron Giant, Frequency, X-Men, and the mini series, Band of Brothers produced by Steven Spielberg. In this period Brett also co-produced and provided additional score on Paramount's Against the Ropes.

In 1999 Brett helped produce the concert that saw Metallica pair up with The San Francisco Symphony Orchestra as assistant Musical Director. The album has since sold over five million copies worldwide. In 2002 Brett went on to plan and execute, again as assistant Musical Director and in close partnership with the BBC, Party at the Palace (part of the Queen's Golden Jubilee Celebrations). This event was broadcast live to a multi-million audience worldwide with a gold CD in less than a week. Brett co-ordinated and arranged many of the collaborations both with traditional rock pairings and new orchestral interpretations.

Film and television

Brett has written extensively for film and television, including scores for TriStar Picture's Planet 51 and the 13-part NBC primetime series, Crusoe. Brett's collaborative work as composer, conductor and orchestrator with Harald Kloser can be heard in the feature film 2012 and the thriller Anonymous (film) directed by Roland Emmerich. Brett became a part of the creative team behind the film 10,000 BC.
Brett also scored the music for the horror feature Outpost, directed by Steve Barker. In addition, Brett has written, orchestrated and conducted for the 2007 releases of Transformers for DreamWorks and The Nanny Diaries for The Weinstein Company.

In May 2013, Brett once again collaborated with Roland Emmerich on his major film White House Down. Brett also spent the summer working on One Chance (The Weinstein Company) working closely with Paul Potts and James Corden producing their vocal performances and arranging the material. Brett also composed the score to Stephen Frears film Lay the Favorite.

Walking With Dinosaurs - The Live Experience
Brett travelled to Australia to collaborate on Walking with Dinosaurs: The Arena Spectacular. Working with the Sydney Symphony Orchestra he composed and conducted over 80 minutes of music to score the live arena show. The show features 20 life-size, animatronic dinosaurs, as they battle through evolution. It has recently finished a worldwide tour seen by over eight million people in 217 cities having won numerous awards since its opening in 2007.

Disney - Imagination Parks
To mark the global relaunch of Disney Stores, Brett was asked to write music designed to thrill both children and parents alike. The "Imagination Parks" introduced new interactive zones, live events and mini theatres, which opened officially in Madrid on 6 July 2011.

Batman Live
Brett's music can again be heard in arenas across the world in the stage show Batman Live. The score to accompany the DC superhero incorporates full symphonic forces, including choir. The show premiered in Manchester, UK in July 2011 and toured North America in 2012.

Queen's Diamond Jubilee/Party in the Palace
Working with the BBC and Gary Barlow in 2012, Brett composed and conducted the Diamond Jubilee of Elizabeth II, celebrating the 60-year reign of the Queen alongside Paul McCartney, Annie Lennox and Stevie Wonder. Brett's Diamond Jubilee collaboration followed on from the 2002 BBC 'Party in the Palace', where he served as Assistant Musical Director as part of the Queen's Golden Jubilee celebrations.

Credits

Film & Television

Concerts/Arena Shows

Commercials

Flora - Voyage
Virgin Trains West Coast – Falling in Love
Stella Artois - Circus
Virgin Atlantic – Kitty Hawk
Vodafone – Work and Play
Vodafone – Speech Bubbles

External links
Official Website

References

English composers
English conductors (music)
British male conductors (music)
Living people
1974 births
21st-century British conductors (music)
21st-century British male musicians